The New Haven Symphony Orchestra is an American symphony orchestra based in New Haven, Connecticut. The New Haven Symphony Orchestra gave its first concert in 1895 and is the fourth oldest orchestra in the United States. Today, the orchestra is made up of over 65 professionals, most of whom live and work in the Greater New Haven area. The NHSO is currently directed by Maestro Alasdair Neale and celebrated the 125th anniversary of its first concert on January 25, 2020.

History 
The NHSO was founded in 1894 by Morris Steinert (a music merchant) and Horatio William Parker (the head of Yale University's Department of Music). Many of the earliest American symphony orchestras were based in large cities like Boston or New York City, yet Steinert and Parker were able to form a viable orchestra made up of local musicians in a relatively smaller city. The original members of the NHSO were mainly German-Americans seeking to continue the orchestral traditions of their native country in the United States, where classical music was less appreciated at the time.

The first performance of the NHSO took place January 25, 1895 at a now-defunct theater on Chapel Street in New Haven near the present-day Union League Café. The program included works by Bach, Beethoven, Mendelssohn, and Schubert, as well as two solos performed by Isidore Troostwyk, a Dutch-born violinist who had recently arrived as a Professor of Music at Yale. Troostwyk served as concertmaster of the new orchestra.

In its early years, the NHSO was closely tied to Yale University, drawing its conductors from the School of Music faculty and serving on occasion as a laboratory for Yale composers and performers. The University also offered financial and organizational support. Before the construction of Woolsey Hall in 1901, the orchestra performed in various local venues including the Hyperion Theater, Alumni Hall (later replaced by Wright Hall, on Elm St) and College Street Hall (on the site of the present Palace Theater)

In 1901, the newly built Woolsey Hall became the chief performance venue of the NHSO. The inaugural concert at Woolsey featured an organ concerto, which made use of the hall’s iconic organ.

The Pops concert series began in 1945, with the first performance indoors at the New Haven Arena, on Grove Street, home of the New Haven Eagles ice hockey team. Later that summer, four more concerts were played in the Yale Bowl, for which a band shell was eventually constructed. The outdoor concerts were a great financial success, drawing nearly 40,000 people the first summer.

Throughout the years, the NHSO has continued these traditions of performance and education—supporting programs in the schools and community, and presenting both classical repertoire and pops concerts. The orchestra has performed regularly in New Haven and has also toured throughout Connecticut and beyond (including performances at Lincoln Center and Carnegie Hall); it has given numerous radio broadcasts and made the world-premiere recording of the complete five-movement version of Mahler's first symphony.

Now exceeding 125 years of continuous operation, the New Haven Symphony Orchestra continues to fulfill its mission of touching the lives of those in the region with a broad array of musical offerings, played to the highest standards.

Programs and venues

Classics Series at Woolsey Hall 
The NHSO Symphony Series consists of seven concerts held at Woolsey Hall in New Haven and conducted by Alasdair Neale, Music Director. These concerts feature classical works from a variety of artistic periods, and take place on selected Thursday nights.

The free Prelude lectures precede the concerts by one hour, and feature a guest speaker. The Student Showcase takes place in the rotunda of Woolsey Hall 45 minutes before each curtain, and features talented students from the region.

Pops Series
The NHSO Pops Series takes place on selected Saturday afternoons at the Hamden Middle School in Hamden, CT, and Sunday afternoons at Shelton Intermediate School in Shelton, CT. The well-attended shows highlights those works not traditionally found in the classical repertoire — such as flamenco, vocal jazz, and big band music.

Family Series
The NHSO Family Series provide a lively introduction to the orchestra through programs specifically designed for children and their families. Family concerts occur on select Saturdays and Sundays at Davis Street School in New Haven, CT and at the Shelton Intermediate School in Shelton, CT. All concerts are preceded by an Instrument Discovery Zone where children are invited to try out various orchestral instruments for themselves.

Education Programs

Young People's Concerts
The NHSO presents Young People’s Concerts for over 10,000 students across the state of Connecticut each year. Through partnerships with a number of school districts, the NHSO introduces students to musical instruments, genres, and composers, supported by an extensive curriculum guide.  The biggest event is the Young People’s Concert for the Greater New Haven community held in the spring at Woolsey Hall.

Creating Musical Readers
The “Creating Musical Readers” initiative, geared towards Pre-K to 2nd grade students, highlights instruments from each of the four families of the orchestra in the context of literacy activities, and is performed at schools, community centers, libraries, and the Connecticut Children’s Museum. Each event features a NHSO musician accompanying a storybook about their instrument.

Young Composer Project
NHSO’s “Young Composer Project” allows high school students to study advanced music theory and composition with award-winning professional composers such as Christopher Theofandis and Augusta Read Thomas. Two years of seminars and lessons lead to premiere performances of student chamber works by NHSO musicians.

School Night at the Symphony
Every year, a Classic Series concert is designated as the School Night at the Symphony concert where greater New Haven students, faculty, staff, and their families enjoy free reserved tickets to an evening of exciting music with the NHSO.  Special children’s programs are distributed which introduce students to concert etiquette, instruments of the orchestra, and composers. However they have toured around Cyprus, Germany, France, Spain and Turkey.

Guest artists 
The NHSO has enjoyed a long history of fruitful collaborations with visiting artists and soloists. Some of the most memorable names include Vladimir Ashkenazy, Joshua Bell, Van Cliburn, Renée Fleming, James Galway, Glenn Gould, Yo-Yo Ma, Jessye Norman, Itzhak Perlman, Mstislav Rostropovich, Artur Rubinstein, Emanuel Ax, Gil Shaham, and Pinchas Zukerman.

The NHSO Pops Series has also brought some legends to New Haven. Such notables as Dave Brubeck, Arthur Fiedler, Dizzy Gillespie, Benny Goodman, Wynton Marsalis, Buddy Rich, Ray Charles, Artie Shaw, and Sarah Vaughan have delighted audiences onstage with the New Haven Symphony Orchestra.

Notes

External links
 Official site

American orchestras
Musical groups from Connecticut
Tourist attractions in New Haven, Connecticut
Culture of New Haven, Connecticut
Musical groups established in 1895
Performing arts in Connecticut
1895 establishments in Connecticut